Maia Hirasawa (born May 5, 1980) is a Swedish singer-songwriter of Swedish and Japanese parentage.

She was born and raised in Sollentuna, Stockholm, Sweden but has lived for many years in Gothenburg. Maia became known through Annika Norlin's band Hello Saferide, where she is a back-up singer. Her solo career began in early 2007 when the song "And I Found This Boy" started being played heavily on Swedish radio. The single was followed up by the album "Though, I'm Just Me" and the single "Gothenburg". During the summer of 2007 she toured around Sweden, playing at such shows as Allsång på Skansen, Hultsfredsfestivalen, Peace & Love and Arvika Festival. In 2010 she for the first time released material in Swedish with the EP "Dröm bort mig igen".

Discography

Albums

Extended plays
2006 – The My New Friend EP
2010 – Dröm bort mig igen
2011 – Boom!

Singles

Songs as featured artist

References

External links

Maia Hirasawa official website
LAist Interview

1980 births
Living people
Swedish singer-songwriters
Swedish people of Japanese descent
English-language singers from Sweden
Swedish-language singers
21st-century Swedish singers
People from Sollentuna Municipality